Air Marshal Sir John Darcy Baker-Carr,  (13 January 1906 – 9 July 1998) was a senior Royal Air Force commander during the early 1960s.

Origins
He was the second son of Brigadier General Christopher D'Arcy Bloomfield Saltren Baker-Carr (1878–1949) and his first wife Sarah de Witt (1880–1969), daughter of William Russell Quinan who was in the explosives business with Kenneth Bingham Quinan (his nephew).

RAF career
Baker-Carr joined the Royal Air Force in 1929. He served in the Second World War in the Technical Branch. After the war he was appointed Deputy Director of Personnel at the Air Ministry and then Station Commander at RAF St Athan from 1953. He went on to be Air Officer Commanding No. 41 Group in 1959 and then acting Air Member for Supply and Organisation in early 1963 before retiring in 1964.

Family
On 30 June 1934 at Hambledon, Hampshire, he married Margery Alexandra (1907–2003), daughter of Major-General Alistair Grant Dallas CB CMG. They had no children.

References

1906 births
1998 deaths
Companions of the Order of the Bath
Knights Commander of the Order of the British Empire
Officers of the Legion of Merit
Royal Air Force air marshals
Military personnel from Kent
Royal Air Force personnel of World War II
Recipients of the Air Force Cross (United Kingdom)